is an Echizen Railway Mikuni Awara Line railway station located in the city of Sakai, Fukui Prefecture, Japan.

Lines

Station layout
The station consists of two side platforms connected to the station building by a level crossing. The station is unattended.

Adjacent stations

History
On September 1, 1942 the Keifuku Electric Railway merged with Mikuni Awara Electric Railway. Operations were halted from June 25, 2001. The station reopened on August 10, 2003 as an Echizen Railway station. The station was renamed to its present name on March 25, 2017.

Passenger statistics
In fiscal 2015, the station was used by an average of 135 passengers daily (boarding passengers only).

Surrounding area
The station is at the center of a small cluster of residences and shops. Fukui Prefectural Route 102 lies to the south.
The general-aviation Fukui Airport is located roughly 1.5 kilometers east.

See also
 List of railway stations in Japan

References

External links

  

Railway stations in Japan opened in 1928
Railway stations in Fukui Prefecture
Mikuni Awara Line
Sakai, Fukui